Gazna is a village located in Nadia District, West Bengal, India. The village and its bazaar are called "Gazna Bazaar".

Education

There is a high school named Gazna High School and more than four primary schools. High school stream is 10 + 2 also known as higher secondary. Students come from Gazna and nearby villages such as Khantura, Chunari, and Bhjanghat.

Transport

Gazna Bazar is connected to Bagula and Majhdia with bus service on Gazna Road. Taraknagar-Gazna Road connects Gazna with Taraknagar rail station. Buses, cars, and country vans operate on these routes.

Culture and activities
Gazna hosts the week-long Rasjatra festival managed by the Gazna Bazaar Committee. Cricket, football tournaments and social drama are organised here.

References

Villages in Nadia district